Max Feldbauer (1869–1948) was a German painter, associated with the Munich Secession. He is primarily known for rural, Bavarian scenes.

Life and work 
His father, Josef Feldbauer, served as the Mayor of Neumarkt from 1868 to 1876. After his father and his five younger siblings had died, he and his mother moved to Munich. His first art lessons were at the  Kunstgewerbeschule. He then attended the private art school operated by Simon Hollósy, where he was introduced to Impressionism, and continued his studies at the Academy of Fine Arts, Munich. His instructors there included Otto Seitz, Paul Hoecker and Johann Caspar Herterich.  

In 1899, he married the painter, Elise Eigner, of Schwandorf. In 1908, he joined the Munich Secession. He also ran his own painting school, in Mitterndorf, near the Dachau art colony, from 1912 to 1922. In addition to all of these activities, he provided illustrations for Die Jugend (Youth), a weekly arts magazine. 

After several trips through France and Italy, he settled near Dachau. After the Nazis came to power in 1933, he was initially banned from exhibiting.

He returned to Munich, but was bombed out of his home in 1944. Ironically, that same year, he was included on the "Gottbegnadeten-Liste" (God given list) of artists who were considered crucial to Nazi culture. Unable to find another home, he moved to Oberschneiding, where he died four years later.

His works may be seen at the Gemäldegalerie Alte Meister, Bayerische Staatsgemäldesammlungen, Staatliche Graphische Sammlung, and the Städtische Galerie im Lenbachhaus, among others.

Selected paintings

References

Further reading 
 Ewald Bender, "Feldbauer, Max" In: Allgemeines Lexikon der Bildenden Künstler von der Antike bis zur Gegenwart, Vol. 11: Erman–Fiorenzo, E. A. Seemann, Leipzig 1915 (Online)
 "Max Feldbauer", In: Hans Vollmer (Ed.): Allgemeines Lexikon der bildenden Künstler des XX. Jahrhunderts. Vol.2: E–J. E. A. Seemann, Leipzig 1955, pg.87
 Hans-Georg Behr, Herbert Grohmann and Bernd-Olaf Hagedorn Leo Putz, Max Feldbauer und der Kreis der „Scholle“ und „Jugend“ in Dachau um 1900, Verlegt bei Beltz, 1989 
 Karl Breitschaft (Ed.): "125 Jahre Max Feldbauer", In: Die Neurieder Sammlung Munich 1994
 „Akt und Roß genügten mir…“. Der Maler Max Feldbauer 1869–1948, exhibition catalog, Dachau 2015,

External links 

 More works by Feldbauer @ ArtNet
 
 Biography of Feldbauer @ the Galerie Schüller

1869 births
1948 deaths
German artists
Olympic bronze medalists in art competitions
Olympic competitors in art competitions
Academy of Fine Arts, Munich alumni
Academic staff of the Dresden Academy of Fine Arts
People from Neumarkt in der Oberpfalz